Conrad Wallem (born 9 June 2000)  is a Norwegian professional footballer who plays as a midfielder.

External links
 Fotball.no

2000 births
Living people
Norwegian footballers
Association football midfielders
Eliteserien players
People from Nøtterøy
FK Tønsberg players
Arendal Fotball players
Odds BK players
Sportspeople from Vestfold og Telemark